Gurjiq (also Romanized as Gūrjīq; also known as Gurja, Gūrjaq, Gūzḩaq, Gyurdzha, and Kūrjaq) is a village in Kaghazkonan-e Shomali Rural District, Kaghazkonan District, Meyaneh County, East Azerbaijan Province, Iran. At the 2006 census, its population was 115, in 38 families.

References 

Populated places in Meyaneh County